Taveuni is elongated shield volcano on Taveuni Island, Fiji, and its peak (Mount Uluigalau) reaches 1,241 meters above sea level.

History
Volcanism on Taveuni began circa 780,000 years ago, but most volcanic activity took place during the Holocene Epoch, which started about 11,000 years ago.

Holocene Activity
Since 9500 B.C. 167 volcanic vents have formed, mainly along the southern inland tip. The youngest vent formed sometime between 4690 and 4900 B.C. Eruptions occurred at an interval of about 70 years, but since 1200 B.C., there have been six periods of time with frequent eruptions, each spanning between 200 and 400 years.

Hazards
If an eruption does occur, Taveuni's economy could easily be destroyed. Nearly all farms will catch on Fire and nearly every port in Taveuni is in a hydrovolcanic hazard zone or a lahar hazard zone, and all imports/exports would be completely stopped until the ports are repaired.

Lava Flows
Unlike many other volcanoes, the largest hazard from Taveuni is actually its lava flows, which are exceptionally hot (940-1125 degrees Celsius). Because Taveuni is heavily forested, fires can spread fast and easily, but mainly the southern flank of the island will be directly affected by the lava.

Ballistic Ejection
Another major hazard of an eruption on Taveuni is the lava being shot into the air. In some cases lava has been ejected about 1.8 kilometers into the air, and the sheer force of the lava falling can easily destroy any structure on the island that it hits.

Volcanic Gases
Volcanic gases are another major hazard to Taveuni, as they can easily cause respiration problems, poison water, and corrode metal. Most of the gases include:
 H2O
 CO2
 SO2
 HCl
 NH3
 H2S
 HF
and a few others.

Lahars
Lahars are a fast-moving mixture of volcanic debris and water that are fatal towards creatures and have the potential to destroy many buildings. The path of lahars on Taveuni will be significantly affected by Taveuni's topography. It is likely that they will strike the southern flank of the island, as many of the vents formed are on a slope leading there.

Hydrovolcanic Potential
A hydrovolcanic eruption occurs when lava comes into contact with water. Hydrovolcanic eruptions can cause violent explosions and large waves. Radiocarbon dating has shown that many hydrovolcanic eruptions occurred in the past. It is quite possible they will occur again during a future eruption.

Economic Effects of Taveuni
The volcano on Taveuni island has a generally good effect on its economy, as it leaves behind rich volcanic soils for farming, in fact, Taveuni island is sometimes referred to as the "Garden State" because of the soil. Since Taveuni's main income is from agriculture, copra, dalo, and kava crops (Taveuni's major crops) thrive in the rich soil.

Tourism in Taveuni
Taveuni has attracted many tourists, as there are a total of 13 resorts on the island. Most of these resorts have the same activities as you may call it. Tourists came to Taveuni to see the world Heritage Park which is located in Bouma. Among these there are cascading waterfalls in Bouma and Lavena and Natural Waterslide, blow holes, Lagoons, the famous Rainbow Reef, the great white Wall Dive, the Location of the second Blue Lagoon Movie, Somosomo Straits and scenic Lookouts.

References
 Sopac assessment
 
 Official Taveuni tourism website

Volcanoes of Fiji
Taveuni
Pleistocene shield volcanoes
Holocene shield volcanoes